NGC 7035 and NGC 7035A are a pair of interacting lenticular galaxies located around 400 to 430 million light-years away in the constellation of Capricornus. The main galaxy, NGC 7035 was discovered by astronomer Frank Muller in 1886.

See also 
 Arp 272
 List of NGC objects (7001–7840)

References

External links 

Interacting galaxies
Lenticular galaxies
Capricornus (constellation)
7035
66258
Astronomical objects discovered in 1886